Jenny Huston (born 24 August 1973) is a Canadian presenter of radio and television in Ireland. She was disc jockey on RTÉ 2fm, an occasional presenter on RTÉ Radio 1 and a television presenter with channels operated by Raidió Teilifís Éireann.; Huston presents an indie rock and pop music show on Friday nights and a rock anthems show which is broadcast on Sunday nights. A highlight of her television career was co-hosting RTÉ's Electric Picnic coverage with Tom Dunne in 2006.

In July 2006, Huston fronted RTÉ 2fm's coverage of Oxegen that summer. She has broadcast for RTÉ 2fm at Oxegen 2007, Oxegen 2008 and Oxegen 2009, as well as continuing her coverage of the Electric Picnic for the radio station. She is regularly dispatched to musical events such as Electric Picnic, Oxegen and South by Southwest for live broadcasting purposes.

In 2011 she gained listeners in the JNLRs.

Career

Books
Huston's book In Bloom—Irish Bands Now was released on 27 November 2009. The book features interviews with fifteen contemporary musical acts. Several of the bands featured in the book accompanied her to the book's launch at Wicklow Street's Tower Records.

Personal life
Huston's family live in Canada and Ireland; her mother in Kilkenny, a brother and sister in Canada. On her official website, Jenny lists the PJ Harvey album To Bring You My Love or Pixies album Surfer Rosa as "probably" her favourite album of all time, and Beastie Boys, Ministry and Radiohead as—so far—the best gigs she has ever been to.

She is a close friend of rival Canadian disc jockey Alison Curtis from Today FM. Huston showed Curtis a picture of Future Kings of Spain and said, "I think you'd like him [bassist, Anthony Hegarty]", with Curtis replying, "Oh I don't think so. He's kinda pretty". Curtis met him later that night, then deciding: "Actually I do [like him]. I'll have a piece of that [Hegarty] please". This piece turned into a 2007 marriage after a long-term relationship.

Awards
Huston received Best DJ nominations at both the 2005 and 2006 Meteor Awards but lost out on both occasions to Ray D'Arcy from Today FM.

|-
| 2005 || Jenny Huston || Best DJ at the Meteor Awards || 
|-
| 2006 || Jenny Huston || Best DJ at the Meteor Awards || 
|-

References

External links
 Huston's page on RTÉ 2fm's website
 Jenny's trip across America in aid of Temple Street Children's Hospital (included is an image of her in Arizona under a large dog)
 Cork – Jenny's involvement in the European Capital of Culture 2005
 Jenny Goes to College

1973 births
Living people
Irish music journalists
Irish women journalists
Journalists from British Columbia
Other Voices presenters
Irish women radio presenters
Irish women television presenters
RTÉ 2fm presenters
RTÉ television presenters
TXFM presenters
People from Vancouver